This is a list of members of the tenth parliament of the South Australian House of Assembly, which sat from 1881 until March 1884. The members were elected at the 1881 state election in April 1881.

 East Adelaide MHA George Fowler resigned on 7 June 1881. Thomas Johnson won the resulting by-election on 17 June.
 Yatala MHA David Murray was unseated on 28 June 1881. He contested and won the resulting by-election, but resigned on 18 August. Josiah Howell Bagster won the resulting by-election on 6 September.
 Onkaparinga MHA Friedrich Krichauff resigned on 22 May 1882. Rowland Rees won the resulting by-election on 15 June.
 Flinders MHA Ebenezer Cooke resigned on 24 October 1882. Patrick Boyce Coglin won the resulting by-election on 1 December.
 Sturt MHA William Townsend died on 25 October 1882. Thomas King was elected unopposed on 13 November.
 Victoria MHA George Charles Hawker resigned on 11 May 1883. William Whinham won the resulting by-election on 15 June.

References

Members of South Australian parliaments by term
19th-century Australian politicians